The Women's 78 kg competition at the 2010 World Judo Championships was held at 9 September at the Yoyogi National Gymnasium in Tokyo, Japan. Thirty-two competitors contested for the medals, being split in four pools where the winner advanced to the medal round.

Pool A

Pool B

Pool C

Pool D

Repechage

Finals

References

 Results

External links
 
 Official Site 

W78
World Judo Championships Women's Half Heavyweight
World W78